Quinéville is a commune in the Manche department in north-western France.

The Chateau de Quineville is in the village, along with a church, the eglise Notre-Dame.

See also
Communes of the Manche department

References

Communes of Manche
Populated coastal places in France